Owrta Qeshlaq (also Romanized as Owrtā Qeshlāq; also known as Owrtā Qeshlāq-e Īlkhchī (Persian: اورتاقشلاق ايلخچي)) is a village in Azadlu Rural District, Muran District, Germi County, Ardabil Province, Iran. At the 2006 census, its population was 34, in 6 families.

References 

Towns and villages in Germi County